The Cambodian Second League was founded by the Football Federation of Cambodia. During the league, 9 teams compete against each other for the 2017 Cambodian League.

Rules 
One team from each of the six different areas can enter the Cambodian Second League. Four teams from each of these Provinces: Western, Eastern, Northern, and Central- compete for entry. The Southern Province has five teams, and there are three teams from the Municipal Province.

The top team from each region plays in the Cambodian Second League upon qualification. The six teams that play in the Cambodian Second League are not permitted to have foreign players. Each team is required to have an even number of players under 21 years of age, and players over 21 years of age.

During the competition there is no game play off. Each team played on a single round-robin basis at the pre-selected hosts. The top two teams will play in the top leagues of the 2017 season.

The Cambodian Second League begins in early April 2016 and continues until June 2016. Games are held every Sunday.

The clubs that play in the top league have youth teams who play in Cambodian Second League, and the Football Federation of Cambodia will allow them to join the competition. However, if their youth team finished in the top two, it will not be allowed to play in the top league. Instead, it will play teams that finished 3rd or 4th in the competition.

Youth players who are members of the Under 16 Cambodia National Football Team and trained at the Bati training center are not allowed to join the competition.

Teams
 Electricite du Cambodge
 FFC Academy
 Kampong Chhnang
 Kampong Speu
 Kirivong Sok Sen Chey
 National Defense Ministry U-19
 Siem Reap Angkor
 Sihanoukville Autonomous Port
 Svay Rieng II

Stadiums and locations

League table

Result table

Top scorers

Awards

 The player of the season: Sieng Chanthea of FFC Academy
 Top goal scorer: Phanny E Ratha of Electricite du Cambodge (9 goals)
 The goalkeeper of the season: Srun Sengly of Kirivong Sok Sen Chey
 The coach of the season: Phan Chanphat of Kirivong Sok Sen Chey
 Fair play: Kirivong Sok Sen Chey

See also
 2016 Cambodian League
 2016 Hun Sen Cup

References

Cambodian Second League seasons
2016 in Cambodian football